Jayankondan block is a revenue block of Ariyalur district of the Indian state of Tamil Nadu. This revenue block consist of 35 panchayat villages.

List of Panchayat Villages 
They are,

References 

Revenue blocks of Ariyalur district